, "contract children", or "indentured child laborers" were children in Switzerland who were taken from their parents, often due to poverty or moral reasons (e.g. the mother being unmarried, very poor, of Yenish origin, etc.), and sent to live with new families, often poor farmers who needed cheap labour. In the early 2000s, many of these children, by then adults, publicly stated that they had been severely mistreated by their new families, suffering neglect, beatings and other physical and psychological abuse. The  scheme was common in Switzerland until the 1960s.

History
Investigations by historian Marco Leuenberger brought to light that in 1930 there were some 35,000 indentured children; though he suspects the real figure was twice that much, and between 1920 and 1970 more than 100,000 are believed to have been placed with families or homes. There were auctions in which children were handed over to the farmer asking the least money from the authorities, thus securing cheap labour for his farm and relieving the authority from the financial burden of looking after the children. In the 1930s, 20% of all agricultural labourers in the Canton of Bern were children below the age of 15.

The petition Wiedergutmachungsinitiative for a "restitution package of about 500 million Swiss Francs (£327m) for the 10,000 contract children estimated to be alive" was launched in April 2014 and acquired the 100,000 signatures necessary to become a national referendum.

An official apology was made on April 11, 2013, by the Swiss government.

In culture
In 2008, Roland Begert, an indentured child himself, published his autobiographical novel , causing a stir in Switzerland, where authorities and the general public had previously shut their eyes. Begert's story told how disadvantaged youngsters were forcefully apprenticed and put to work in industry after the war, when there was a shortage of labour. In 2012 an exhibition called "" ('Contract Children Speak') toured Switzerland, drawing attention to the fate of these children. In the same year,  ('The Foster Boy'), a feature film, was released, reaching number one at the Swiss box office.

See also
 Kinder der Landstrasse
 Wiedergutmachungsinitiative

References

Child labour
Society of Switzerland
Child abuse in Switzerland
Child labour in Switzerland
Yenish people